USS Burke (DE-215/APD-65), a  of the United States Navy, was named in honor of Lieutenant Commander John E. Burke (1905–1942), who was killed in action, aboard the battleship  during the Naval Battle of Guadalcanal on 15 November 1942.

Burke was laid down on 1 January 1943 by the Philadelphia Navy Yard; launched on 4 April 1943; sponsored by Mrs. Miriam Katherine Burke, the widow of Lt. Comdr. Burke; and commissioned on 20 August 1943.

Service history

Atlantic convoys, 1943–1944
Following shakedown off Bermuda, the destroyer escort participated in general type training in late September and October. On 29 October, she joined a convoy bound for Ireland and arrived safely at Derry on 11 November. Burke soon returned to New York and made eight more uneventful round-trip transatlantic voyages to escort convoys to Europe or North Africa and back.

Pacific Fleet, 1945
On 25 January 1945, the warship entered Sullivan Drydock and Repair Corporation in Brooklyn, New York, for conversion to a Charles Lawrence-class high speed transport. Redesignated APD-65, Burke left the shipyard on 8 April and was slated for service in the war against Japan.

Burke transited the Panama Canal and joined the Pacific Fleet on 1 May at Balboa. There, she also embarked officers and sailors for transportation to San Diego and, after reaching southern California, took on board more passengers for passage to Pearl Harbor. The high-speed transport's mission was to carry Underwater Demolition Teams (UDT's) to assault areas for prelanding beach clearance. Burke trained with UDT's on Maui in preparation for service in the conquest of Okinawa.

The fast transport arrived off Okinawa on 27 June after the major part of the struggle to take that island was over. She briefly served on picket duty off Ie Shima, but Burkes duty was cut short on 30 June, and she sailed for the Philippines. The high-speed transport trained near Legaspi on southeastern Luzon with other amphibious ships in preparation for the expected invasion of the Japanese home islands. However, the explosion of atomic bombs at Hiroshima and Nagasaki early in August demonstrated to Japan the futility of continuing the war, so Burke never had an opportunity to participate in an assault. She returned to Leyte and was there when the Japanese capitulated on 15 August.

Burke escorted occupation forces to Japan and, as the formal surrender ceremony took place on board the battleship  in Tokyo Bay on 2 September, the transport steamed up the channel and into the bay. Burke escorted convoys of occupation troops until 26 October then proceeded to Manila. After transporting men and equipment among the islands of the Philippine archipelago, Burke embarked returning veterans and headed for home. Upon arrival at San Diego, the fast transport disembarked her passengers and got underway for the east coast of the United States.

Atlantic Fleet, 1946–1949
In January 1946, Burke became the flagship for Transport Division 121 and commenced operations with the Atlantic Fleet. She participated in fleet anti-submarine and amphibious exercises along the east coast and in the West Indies. She also trained UDT's and naval reservists. On 16 April 1949, Burke reported to the Charleston Naval Shipyard for inactivation.

Decommissioning and transfer
She was placed out of commission, in reserve, on 23 June 1949 and was towed to Green Cove Springs, Florida, to be berthed with the Atlantic Reserve Fleet. Late in 1967, Burke was selected for sale under the Military Assistance Program to the Republic of Colombia. Her name was struck from the United States Navy List on 1 June 1968, and she was transferred to the Colombian Navy on 8 December. She was commissioned as ARC Almirante Brión (DT-07)''' and served until disposed of in 1974.

AwardsBurke'' earned one battle star for her World War II service.

References

External links 
 

Buckley-class destroyer escorts
Charles Lawrence-class high speed transports
Ships built in Philadelphia
1943 ships
World War II frigates and destroyer escorts of the United States
World War II amphibious warfare vessels of the United States
Cold War amphibious warfare vessels of the United States
Buckley-class destroyer escorts of the Colombian Navy